Lindis Pass (elevation 971 m) is located in the South Island of New Zealand. A carpark at the top of the pass provides access to a viewpoint and two short trails to other viewing spots.

Lindis Pass lies between the towns of Cromwell (78km, 55 minutes drive) in Central Otago and Omarama (32km, 21 minutes drive) in Canterbury, on the main inland route to the Waitaki Basin in the Otago Region.

The pass lies between the valleys of the Lindis and Ahuriri Rivers.

State Highway 8 transverses the pass on its route from the Waitaki Basin to Central Otago. The pass is the highest point on the South Island's state highway network, and the second highest point on the New Zealand state highway network, after the Desert Road (SH 1) in the Central North Island. Despite this, it is not considered one of the alpine passes as it located in the dry interior of the South Island. Summers are typically hot and dry while heavy snow and frequent ice are common in winter. The Lindis had a web camera installed in 2018 to help ensure traffic controllers and maintenance crews can monitor the highway as well as informing travellers so they are prepared for road conditions. Vehicle crashes on the Lindis Pass have occurred regularly. There is no cell phone coverage on the Lindis Pass.  The New Zealand Transport Agency has upgraded aspects of state highway 8 over Lindis Pass by installing new wire-rope safety barriers, improving signage and installing electronic speed warnings in 2013.

Lindis Pass is surrounded on all sides by grassland which comprises snow tussocks. Buttercups (ranunculus haastii) are very common on Longslip Mountain (1494 metres).  The New Zealand falcon/kārearea, New Zealand pipit/pihoihoi and spotted skink can be seen in the Lindis Pass. The lower altitude beech forests and shrublands provide habitat for fantail/pīwakawaka, grey warbler/riroriro and rifleman/tītitipounamu.

References

Landforms of Canterbury, New Zealand
Mountain passes of New Zealand
Transport in Canterbury, New Zealand
Landforms of Otago